The 12859 / 12860 Gitanjali Express is a daily train running between two metro cities, Kolkata, in West Bengal and Mumbai, (Chhatrapati Shivaji Maharaj Terminus) in Maharashtra connecting the East with the West. Numbered 12859/60 this train belongs to the Superfast category. This train takes 30½ hrs to cover the distance of 1968 km between Mumbai and Howrah while the return takes 31 hrs 15 mins. This is first train which depart behind pure AC Loco from Mumbai CSMT after conversion of Mumbai CSMT to Thane from DC to AC. It has the top most priority in Howrah Mumbai route.

Relevance
Rabindranath Tagore, a famous poet of India, wrote the book Gitanjali. Since this train, too, starts from Bengal this train has the same name. This is the first Classless train in India introduced by Ex Railway Minister Prof. Madhu Dandvate on 26 December 1977.

Train Schedule
From Chhatrapati Shivaji Maharaj Terminus to Howrah - 12859. The train starts from Chhatrapati Shivaji Maharaj Terminus everyday.

Note : Train stops at Kasara & Igatpuri Railway Station only for Bankers Loco attachment & removal at the back of the Train. There is no Commercial halt at these Stations.

From Howrah to Chhatrapati Shivaji Maharaj Terminus - 12860. The train starts from Howrah everyday.

Arrival & Departure 
Train No.12859 leaves source point, Chhatrapati Shivaji Maharaj Terminus at 6:00 am and reaches its destination station Howrah Junction at 12:30 noon the next day.
Train No.12860 leaves Howrah Junction at 2:05 pm and reach its destination, Chhatrapati Shivaji Maharaj Terminus at 9:20 pm next day.

Traction
It is hauled by a Santragachi based WAP-7 Locomotive (End to End). Top speed permissible is 130km/h.

Coach composition

See also 
Dedicated Intercity trains of India

References

External links

Rail transport in Howrah
Transport in Mumbai
Named passenger trains of India
Rail transport in West Bengal
Express trains in India
Rail transport in Maharashtra
Rail transport in Odisha
Rail transport in Chhattisgarh
Rail transport in Jharkhand
Railway services introduced in 1977